John Gow is a Canadian para-alpine skier. He represented Canada at the 1976 Winter Paralympics in alpine skiing. He won the gold medal at the Men's Slalom IV A event, the only event he competed in.

See also 
 List of Paralympic medalists in alpine skiing

References 

Living people
Year of birth missing (living people)
Place of birth missing (living people)
Paralympic alpine skiers of Canada
Alpine skiers at the 1976 Winter Paralympics
Medalists at the 1976 Winter Paralympics
Paralympic gold medalists for Canada
Paralympic medalists in alpine skiing